In Greek mythology, Callidice (Ancient Greek: Καλλιδίκη, Kallidikē) is a name attributed to several individuals.
 Callidice, an Eleusinian princess as one of the daughters of King Celeus and Metaneira, sister of Cleisidice, Demo and Callithoe.
 Callidice, one of the Danaids. She married (and killed) Pandion, son of Aegyptus
 Callidice, queen of Thesprotia and wife of Odysseus. She and Odysseus had a son, Polypoetes, together. According to the Telegony (Epic Cycle), Odysseus was sent on another voyage by the gods after killing all of Penelope's suitors. He journeyed through Epirus and came upon the nation of Thesprotis. Callidice urged him to stay and offered him the kingdom of Thesprotia. There he remained for a number of years, marrying Callidice. The Thesprotians, led by Odysseus and  Callidice, went to war with their neighbors the Brygoi (Brygi, Brygians) and defeated in battle the neighboring peoples who attacked him. Ares was on the Brygoi side but Athena went to support Odysseus and Callidice by engaging the war god in another confrontation until Apollo separates them. When Callidice died, Odysseus returned home to Ithaca, leaving their son, Polypoetes, to rule Thesprotia.

See also

Thesprotians
Telegony

Notes

References 

Apollodorus, The Library with an English Translation by Sir James George Frazer, F.B.A., F.R.S. in 2 Volumes, Cambridge, MA, Harvard University Press; London, William Heinemann Ltd. 1921. ISBN 0-674-99135-4. Online version at the Perseus Digital Library. Greek text available from the same website.
The Homeric Hymns and Homerica with an English Translation by Hugh G. Evelyn-White. Homeric Hymns. Cambridge, MA.,Harvard University Press; London, William Heinemann Ltd. 1914. Online version at the Perseus Digital Library. Greek text available from the same website.

Danaids
Odysseus
Queens in Greek mythology
Princesses in Greek mythology
Eleusinian characters in Greek mythology
Epirotic mythology